BNE, or bne, may refer to:
 Bayesian Nash equilibrium, game theory concept
  or National Library of Spain
 BNE (artist), American graffiti artist
 BNE, the IATA code for Brisbane Airport in the state of Queensland, Australia
 bne, the ISO 639-3 code for the Bintauna language spoken in North Sulawesi, Indonesia
 BNE, the National Rail code for Bourne End railway station in the county of Buckinghamshire, UK
 BNE, the New York Stock Exchange symbol for Bowne & Co., a former US company founded in 1775
 Bandai Namco Entertainment, a Japanese multinational video game publisher
 Business New Europe, business news publishers
 Business for New Europe, an EU-UK relations group

See also
 
 
 B&E or breaking and entering, burglary